The Voiles de Saint-Tropez is a regatta that takes place once a year in the gulf of Saint-Tropez, Var, France.

External links
 Official website
 Dates les Voiles de Saint-Tropez
 Programme les Voiles de Saint Tropez

Annual sporting events in France
Sailing competitions in France
Var (department)
Yachting races
Sailing regattas